The 48 AL is a semi-automatic shotgun manufactured by Luigi Franchi S.p.A.

The gun is available in 12 gauge, 20 gauge and 28 gauge.  It uses a patented action that John Browning developed for the Browning Auto-5. Rounds are cycled through long recoil. Factory models are equipped with walnut stocks and forends. Franchi offers one model with a short stock, and one model with a “Prince-of-Wales” stock. 

The 48 AL comes with a light but durable full aluminum receiver that is polished in black, walnut furniture, and a golden trigger.

References

External links
Franchi 48 AL product page

Long recoil firearms
Semi-automatic shotguns of Italy